Laker or Lakers may refer to:

Los Angeles Lakers, an NBA basketball team from Los Angeles, California, United States

Sports teams

Collegiate
Clayton State Lakers, the NCAA Division II athletic program of Clayton State University in Morrow, Georgia
Grand Valley State Lakers, the athletic program of Grand Valley State University, an NCAA Division II school in Allendale, Michigan
Iowa Lakes Community College Lakers, located in Estherville, Iowa
Lake Superior State Lakers, the athletic program of Lake Superior State University, an NCAA Division II school in Sault Ste. Marie, Michigan that fields an NCAA Division I men's ice hockey team
Mercyhurst Lakers, the athletic program of Mercyhurst University, an NCAA Division II school in Erie, Pennsylvania, with Division I teams in both men's and women's ice hockey
Nipissing Lakers, competing in Ontario University Athletics, in North Bay, Ontario
State University of New York at Oswego (Oswego State) Lakers, an NCAA Division III school, in Oswego, New York

High school
Bonneville High School (Washington Terrace, Utah) Lakers
Calloway County High School Lakers, Murray, Kentucky
Danbury High School Lakers, Marblehead, Ohio
Detroit Lakes High School Lakers, Detroit Lakes, Minnesota
Indian Lake High School Lakers, Lewistown, Ohio
Mercyhurst Preparatory School Lakers, Erie, Pennsylvania
Skaneateles High School Lakers, Skaneateles, New York
West Bloomfield High School Lakers, West Bloomfield, Michigan
Penticton Secondary School Lakers, Penticton, British Columbia

Professional
Doncaster Lakers, a British rugby league club
Hutt Valley Lakers, a former basketball team based in Wellington, New Zealand
Laguna Lakers, a defunct basketball team based in Laguna, Philippines
Penticton Lakers, a Canadian ice hockey team
Peterborough Lakers Jr. A, a box lacrosse team from Peterborough, Ontario, Canada
Rapperswil-Jona Lakers, a Swiss ice hockey team
South Bay Lakers, a team in the NBA G League
Växjö Lakers, a Swedish ice hockey team in Swedish Hockey League

Other uses
Laker (surname)
Lake freighter or laker, a type of cargo ship
Laker Airways, an airline company
Laker Beer, a brand of beer sold in Canada